A satyr is a mythical creature.

Satyr may also refer to:
Satyr (Dungeons & Dragons), a fictional creature in Dungeons & Dragons
Satyr (film), a 1996 pornographic film
Satyr (band), a progressive, post-hardcore band from Atlanta, Georgia
Satyr (musician) or Sigurd Wongraven (born 1975)
HMS Satyr (1916), an R-class destroyer
HMS Satyr (P214), an S-class submarine launched in 1942
USS Satyr (ARL-23)
Miles Satyr, a 1930s British single-seat aerobatic biplane

See also
Common satyr (Aulocera swaha), a butterfly
HMS Satyr, a list of ships
Satyress, a female satyr
Satyricon (disambiguation)
Satyrinae, a subfamily of butterflies
Satyrus (disambiguation)